Jareb Dauplaise (born March 18, 1979) is an American actor. He played Wayne in The Suite Life of Zack & Cody. He has also appeared in a commercial for the restaurant El Pollo Loco. Dauplaise stars in the film The Prankster, playing Blotto.

Dauplaise stars in a web series called Blue Movies and he had a role in the MTV original series The Hard Times of RJ Berger, as the main character's best friend, Miles Jenner.

Filmography

References

External links
 

American male film actors
American male television actors
Living people
1979 births